Wearing a Martyr's Crown is the fourth album by the melodic death metal band Nightrage.  The album was released on 22 June 2009 through German label, Lifeforce Records. The European digipak includes a demo version of "Failure of All Human Emotions" as a bonus track. The Japanese version of the album includes a cover of Metallica's "Holier Than Thou."

On 18 February 2010 Nightrage released their third music video for the song Wearing a Martyr's Crown while on a tour of Greece. The video was once again directed by Bob Katsionis and was recorded at Zero Gravity Studios which is located in Athens.

The title for the instrumental Sting Of Remorse was inspired by lyrics from the song Surge Of Pity which appears on the album A New Disease Is Born.

Track listing

Musical appearances
 "A Grim Struggle", "Collision of Fate", "Shed the Blood", and "Wearing a Martyr's Crown"  were made available as downloadable content for the Rock Band video game series on Xbox. On 30 June 2011 "A Grim Struggle" was made available for download on the PlayStation 3 console.

Band members
 Antony Hämäläinen – Vocals, Lyrics
 Marios Iliopoulos – Guitar, Music composition, Lyrics
 Olof Mörck – Guitar, Music composition
 Anders Hammer – Bass guitar
 Johan Nunez – Drums

Guest musicians
 Gus G. – guitar solo on "Sting of Remorse"
 Sakis Tolis – backing vocals on "Mocking Modesty"
 Elias Holmlid – orchestrations and keyboards on "Shed the Blood", "Futile Tears", "Mocking Modesty", and "Sting of Remorse"

Production
 Fredrik Nordström – Production, Mixing, keyboards on "Abandon"
 Peter In de Betou - Audio Mastering at Tailor Maid Productions
 Henrik Udd – Audio Engineering, Mixing
 Andy Hayball – Assistant Engineer

References

External links
 Nightrage discography page

Nightrage albums
2009 albums
Albums produced by Fredrik Nordström
Lifeforce Records albums